Langza is a small village located in Spiti Tehsil of Lahaul and Spiti district, Himachal Pradesh. It is set at the base of Chau Chau Kang Nilda mountain, also known as the Princess Mountain.

The village has a population of 136 people only. The village is known as the "fossil village" of Spiti valley.

References 

Villages in Lahaul and Spiti district